Telles is a genus of skipper butterflies in the family Hesperiidae.

Species
The following species are recognised in the genus Telles:
 Telles arcalaus (Stoll, 1782)
 Telles pyrex Evans, 1955

References

Natural History Museum Lepidoptera genus database

Hesperiinae
Hesperiidae genera